The 1957 DDR-Oberliga was the ninth season of the DDR-Oberliga, the first tier of league football in East Germany. Rather than in the traditional autumn-spring format the Oberliga played for six seasons from 1955 to 1960 in the calendar year format, modelled on the system used in the Soviet Union. From 1961–62 onwards the league returned to its traditional format.

The league was contested by fourteen teams. SC Wismut Karl-Marx-Stadt, incidentally based at Aue and not Karl-Marx-Stadt, won the championship, the club's second consecutive one, having won the 1956 championship as well. On the strength of the 1957 title Wismut qualified for the 1958–59 European Cup where the club was knocked out by Young Boys Bern in the quarter finals.

Heinz Kaulmann of ASK Vorwärts Berlin was the league's top scorer with 15 goals.

Table
The 1957 season saw two newly promoted clubs, SC Motor Jena and SC Chemie Halle-Leuna.

Results

References

Sources

External links
 Das Deutsche Fussball Archiv  Historic German league tables

1957 domestic association football leagues
1957
Ober
Ober
Ober